Rusalka is a water-nymph in Slavic mythology.

Rusalka may also refer to:

Places 
 Rusałka, Szczecin, a lake in Szczecin, Poland
 Lake Rusałka, Poznań, a lake in Poznań, Poland
 Rusalka, Bulgaria, a resort on the Bulgarian Black Sea Coast
 Rusalka Planitia, a surface feature of the planet Venus

Art and culture 
 Rusalka (opera), an opera by Antonín Dvořák
 , a major though unfinished verse play by Alexander Pushkin
 Rusalka (Dargomyzhsky), an opera by Alexander Dargomyzhsky based on Pushkin's play
 Rusalka (novel), a fantasy novel by C. J. Cherryh
 Mermaid (2007 film) (Russian: Rusalka), a Russian film by Anna Melikian
 Rusalka (1996 film), a 1996 Russian animated short film
 "Rusalka", a song by Radarmaker

Others 
 Russian monitor Rusalka, a Russian ironclad which sank near Helsinki, Finland on September 7, 1893
 Russalka Memorial in Tallinn, by Amandus Adamson